The 2023 FIFA Women's World Cup Final is an upcoming football match to determine the winner of the 2023 FIFA Women's World Cup. It will be the ninth final of the FIFA Women's World Cup, a quadrennial tournament contested by the women's national teams of the member associations of FIFA. The match will be held at Stadium Australia in Sydney, Australia, on 20 August 2023 and will be contested by the winners of the semi-finals.

Venue

Stadium Australia, known as Accor Stadium for sponsorship reasons, was chosen as the final venue on 31 March 2021. The stadium, which opened in March 1999, was built to host the 2000 Summer Olympics, and has a current capacity of 83,500. The stadium hosted the 2000 Olympic men's football gold medal match, as well as fixtures at the men's 2015 AFC Asian Cup, including the final. The stadium also hosts many other sports competitions, including in rugby league, rugby union, cricket and Australian rules football, in addition to concerts.

Route to the final

Match

Details

Notes

References

External links
 

Final
2023
2023–24 in Australian women's soccer

International sports competitions hosted at Sydney Olympic Park
2020s in Sydney
August 2023 sports events in Australia